Mintu (also known as Rumah Bol or Rumah Bel) is a settlement in Sarawak, Malaysia.

Neighbouring settlements include:

References

Populated places in Sarawak